Branson Ultrasonics Corporation is an American developer and manufacturer of ultrasonic manufacturing and cleaning applications.

History 
The company was founded in 1946 by Norman G. Branson, a research engineer for General Electric. He remained president and CEO of the company until 1967. In 1984, Branson Ultrasonics was purchased by Emerson Electric. In 2021, Branson Ultrasonics opened its new headquarters in Brookfield, Connecticut, a suburb of Danbury, where their headquarters was formerly located. The 142,000 square foot headquarters is located in the Berkshire Corporate Park, and cost $49 million.

Technology 
Branson Ultrasonics specializes in the design, development and manufacturing of plastics joining and metal welding equipment. The company develops solutions for precision cleaning, degreasing and processing. The company also has expertise in ultrasonic tooling and magnetostrictive and piezoelectric technology. The company also manufactures the "Sonifier" brand of cell disrupters for laboratory experiments and research studies. The company operates manufacturing facilities in the United States, Canada, Mexico, Germany, the Netherlands, France, Slovakia, China, Hong Kong and Japan. It is ISO 14001 certified for its commitment to environmental efforts.

References

External links
 

Ultrasound
Multinational companies headquartered in the United States
Manufacturing companies established in 1946
Companies based in Danbury, Connecticut
Manufacturing companies based in Connecticut